The Umbrellas, Japan–USA, 1984–91 was a 1991 environmental artwork in which artists Christo and Jeanne-Claude erected yellow and blue umbrella structures in California (between Gorman and Grapevine) and Japan, respectively. The 3,100-umbrella project cost US$26 million and attracted three million visitors. Christo closed the exhibition early after a woman was crushed by a windswept umbrella in California. Separately, a worker was killed during the deconstruction of the Japanese exhibit.

Notes

Bibliography

External links 

 

1991 works
Works by Christo and Jeanne-Claude